Hej, Sokoły (Hey, falcons), proper title Żal za Ukrainą (Longing for Ukraine) or Na zielonej Ukrainie (In green Ukraine) is a Polish and Ukrainian folk song. 

The song's authorship is not completely certain, some historians attribute the writing of the song to the Ukrainian-Polish poet-songwriter Tomasz Padura (1801–1871) (however, according to the latest Ukrainian research, there are no lyrics of the song in any of Padura's song collections), and others believe it was written by the Polish classical composer Maciej Kamieński (1734–1825). The Polish original was translated into several languages. The song is popular in Poland, Ukraine and Slovakia, and to a lesser extent in Belarus, Russia  and the eastern Czech Republic.

The tune was popular among Polish soldiers during the Polish-Soviet War, and was also sung by the Polish Home Army guerrillas during World War II. Polish folk singer Maryla Rodowicz also performed a popular cover of the song.

According to Olga Kharchyshyn, "Hej Sokoły" is based on the motif of a Polish folk song from the 19th century, but with a new chorus and beginning. The song first appeared in the current form in the second half of the 20th century and its Ukrainian versions are translations from Polish. 

The lyrics exist in several versions about a Ukrainian girl to whom her betrothed, a cossack or an uhlan, says goodbye for the last time. It is sometimes presented as being either, or both, a Polish folk song or Ukrainian folk song. The lyrics vary only slightly between the two languages.

Lyrics

First verse

Other verses

Usage during 2022 Russian Invasion of Ukraine
A number of social media videos put out by Ukrainian forces to celebrate victories in the 2022 Russian invasion of Ukraine feature the song as the backing track.

Notes

External links 
 English translation
 Czech text of the song – (c) Martin Adámek, Náchod

Polish folk songs
Polish patriotic songs
Ukrainian folk songs
Ukrainian patriotic songs
Slovak songs
Works about Cossacks